Alpine skiing at the Pan American Games was only held at the 1990 Winter Pan American Games in Las Leñas, Argentina.

Medal table

See also 
1990 Winter Pan American Games

References

Alpine skiing
Pan American Games